BmK NSPK (Buthus martensii Karsch, Neurite-Stimulating Peptide targeting Kv channels) is a toxin isolated from the venom of the Chinese armor-tail scorpion (Mesobuthus martensii), which specifically targets voltage gated potassium channels (Kv), resulting in a direct inhibition of outward potassium current.



Source 
BmK NSPK is a neurotoxin isolated from the venom of the Chinese armor-tail scorpion (Mesobuthus martensii).

Chemistry 
BmK NSPK is a short-chain toxin that has a primary amino acid sequence of 38 amino acids and a molecular weight of 3962.2 Da.

The toxin has a cysteine-stabilized α-helix-β-sheet motif, containing one α-helix connected by disulfide bonds to two parallel β-sheets, which suggests that BmK NSPK belongs to the Csαβ potassium channel blockers.
 
In comparison with BmKTX (Buthus martensii kaliotoxin), which is a previously discovered Kv1.3 channel blocker, BmK NSPK showed 79% sequence homology. Furthermore, BmKTX and BmK NSPK also show structural similarities. In both toxins, the α-helixes contain Leu14 and Ala19/20 and the β-sheets show a similar folding pattern.

Target and Mode of Action 
Whole-cell patch-clamp recordings in mouse spinal cord neurons (SCNs) determined that BmK NSPK targets Kv channels. More specifically, when focussing on the similarities between BmK NSPK and BmKTX, Kv1.3 channels are expected to be the target of BmK NSPK.  When BmK NSPK (300 nM) is introduced to the SCNs, outward potassium (IK) currents are inhibited. As a result, the membrane potential will not repolarize. This is due to inhibition of the transient components (IA) and sustained delayed rectifier components (ID) of IK, which are normally responsible for membrane repolarization.

BmK NSPK has additional effects in SCNs, possibly indirectly caused by the membrane depolarisation that is a consequence of the inhibition of outward potassium currents:

 Spontaneous calcium oscillations (SCOs) are increased in amplitude and frequency with the addition of BmK NSPK.
 When adding higher concentrations (3-300 nM) of BmK NSPK, the membrane of SCNs depolarizes.
 BmK NSPK modulates the release of Nerve Growth Factor in SCNs through the NGF/TrkA signaling pathway, leading to enhanced neurite outgrowth.

References 

Scorpion toxins
Ion channel toxins
Neurotoxins